The Marathon Oil Service Station is a historic automotive service facility at the southeast corner of East 2nd and Spring Streets in downtown Fordyce, Arkansas.  It is a single story building constructed out of red and buff brick, with an auto canopy covered in a tile roof.  The main facade of the building has a parapet which conceals a barrel roof.  The building is divided into two functional bays, an office to the left and a garage bay to the right.  The canopy extends in front of the left bay, and is supported by a single brick column, in which there is an original Marathon Oil logo.  The building is a well-preserved example of a 1920s service station.

The station was listed on the National Register of Historic Places in 1992.

See also
National Register of Historic Places listings in Dallas County, Arkansas

References

Gas stations on the National Register of Historic Places in Arkansas
Buildings and structures completed in 1928
Buildings and structures in Fordyce, Arkansas
Historic district contributing properties in Arkansas
National Register of Historic Places in Dallas County, Arkansas